Jaime Molina (born 3 August 1962) is a Peruvian weightlifter. He competed in the men's middle heavyweight event at the 1984 Summer Olympics.

References

1962 births
Living people
Peruvian male weightlifters
Olympic weightlifters of Peru
Weightlifters at the 1984 Summer Olympics
Place of birth missing (living people)
Pan American Games medalists in weightlifting
Pan American Games bronze medalists for Peru
Weightlifters at the 1983 Pan American Games
20th-century Peruvian people